The 2019 Copa LP Chile Hacienda Chicureo was a professional tennis tournament played on outdoor clay courts. It was the third edition of the tournament which was part of the 2019 ITF Women's World Tennis Tour. It took place in Colina, Chile between 4 and 10 November 2019.

Singles main-draw entrants

Seeds

 1 Rankings are as of 21 October 2019.

Other entrants
The following players received wildcards into the singles main draw:
  Fernanda Brito
  Bárbara Gatica
  Fernanda Labraña
  Ivania Martinich

The following players received entry from the qualifying draw:
  Emiliana Arango
  Victoria Bosio
  María Lourdes Carlé
  Andrea Gámiz
  Nathaly Kurata
  Ana Lantigua de la Nuez
  Luisa Stefani
  Melanie Stokke

Champions

Singles

 Elisabetta Cocciaretto def.  Victoria Bosio, 6–3, 6–4

Doubles

 Hayley Carter /  Luisa Stefani def.  Anna Danilina /  Conny Perrin, 5–7, 6–3, [10–6]

References

External links
 2019 Copa LP Chile Hacienda Chicureo at ITFtennis.com
 Official website 

2019 ITF Women's World Tennis Tour
2019 in Chilean tennis
November 2019 sports events in South America
Tennis tournaments in Chile